Chris Partridge (born November 3, 1980) is an American football coach and former player who currently serves as the linebackers coach for the Michigan Wolverines football team. He is formerly the Paramus Catholic High School head coach and worked as an assistant coach for Michigan Wolverines football from 2016-2020.

Coaching career

Paramus Catholic High School
Partridge was the head coach of Paramus Catholic High School, a position he held for five seasons (2010–2014). While at the helm of the Paladin program, Partridge grew a football program listed 4,250th nationally and 112th in state of New Jersey to the top-ranked team in the state and No. 4 nationally by USA Today. He coached and mentored more than 30 Division I football players during that time, as well as various All-America players.

Michigan
Partridge was hired by Michigan in January 2015 as the Director of Player Personnel. On December 3, 2015, it was announced that Partridge would coach the linebackers for Michigan during the 2016 Citrus Bowl, after the departure of Michigan defensive coordinator and linebackers coach D. J. Durkin, who left to be the head coach at Maryland. Partridge then took over as full time linebackers coach and helped with the special teams. On February 8, 2017, Partridge was promoted to Special Teams Coordinator and continued as linebackers coach. Before the 2018 season, Partridge was offered to join the Alabama Crimson Tide football staff, but chose to stay at Michigan. Weeks after, Partridge received a significant pay raise and new coaching duties. Partridge was assigned to coach safeties and continue as special teams coordinator, Al Washington took over as linebackers coach.

Ole Miss
On January 2, 2020, Chris Partridge was hired by Ole Miss and new head coach Lane Kiffin. Later, Partridge was named co-defensive coordinator alongside former Michigan assistant DJ Durkin. In 2022, he was promoted to play caller while still being co-defensive coordinator with new hire Chris Kiffin.

Michigan (second stint)
Partridge returned to Michigan's football staff for the 2023 season.

References

1980 births
Living people
Ole Miss Rebels football coaches
Michigan Wolverines football coaches
Lafayette Leopards football coaches
The Citadel Bulldogs football coaches
Lafayette College alumni
Sportspeople from Hackensack, New Jersey
High school football coaches in New Jersey
Coaches of American football from New Jersey